The 11th Legislative Assembly of British Columbia sat from 1907 to 1909. The members were elected in the British Columbia general election held in February 1907. The British Columbia Conservative Party led by Richard McBride formed the government.

David McEwen Eberts served as speaker.

Members of the 11th General Assembly 
The following members were elected to the assembly in 1907.:

Notes:

Party standings

By-elections 
By-elections were held for the following members appointed to the provincial cabinet, as was required at the time:
 Henry Esson Young, Provincial Secretary, acclaimed March 12, 1907
 William John Bowser, Attorney General, elected August 15, 1907
 Thomas Taylor, Minister of Public Works, elected January 20, 1909

By-elections were held to replace members for various other reasons:

Notes:

References 

Political history of British Columbia
Terms of British Columbia Parliaments
1907 establishments in British Columbia
1909 disestablishments in British Columbia
20th century in British Columbia